Azatrephes discalis is a moth of the subfamily Arctiinae first described by Francis Walker in 1856. It is found in French Guiana and Brazil.

References

Phaegopterina
Moths described in 1856